The Recruits may refer to:
 "The Recruits", an episode of NCIS: New Orleans
 "The Recruits", an episode of Arrow

See also
 Recruit